Anam Naik is an Indian politician and a senior member of the Biju Janata Dal. He is BJD MLA from Bhawanipatna.

References

People from Kalahandi district
People from Odisha
Odisha politicians
Lok Sabha members from Odisha
Living people
Year of birth missing (living people)
Biju Janata Dal politicians